Walter Runke (1879-1964) was an American politician from Arizona. He served two terms in the Arizona State Senate during the 7th and 8th Arizona State Legislatures, holding the seat from Coconino County.

Runke was born on October 6, 1879, in Algoma, Wisconsin.  He first moved to Arizona in 1901, settling in Winslow, and working for the Bureau of Indian Affairs.  He held several positions with the BIA throughout the western United States, including overseeing the Paiute Indians in Northern Arizona, southern Utah, and western Nevada, heading the Klamath Indian Agency in Oregon, had charge of the Yankton Sioux Tribe in South Dakota, as well as overseeing the Mission Indians in southern California.  In 1920 he and his first wife, Mary Jeanette, moved back to Arizona, this time to Flagstaff, in order for their three children to attend school.  While in the Arizona Senate he was one of those responsible for appropriating the funds to build the Marble Canyon bridge.  In 1928 he was appointed the postmaster at Flagstaff, and remained in the position until 1936.  His first wife died in 1942, and he remarried in 1944, to Laura A. Preston.  He was very active in both the Federated church, and the Masons.  Runke died on November 9, 1964, in his home in Flagstaff.

References

Arizona politicians
Republican Party Arizona state senators
1879 births
1964 deaths